Legends Never Die may refer to:

 Legends Never Die (Chinx album), 2016
 Legends Never Die, a 2007 album by The Dreadnoughts
 Legends Never Die (Juice Wrld album), 2020
 Legends Never Die (R.A. the Rugged Man album), 2013
 "Legends Never Die" (Against the Current song), a song for the 2017 League of Legends World Championship
 "Legends Never Die", a song by Wendy O. Williams from the album WOW, 1984
 "Legends Never Die", a song by Ferras and Katy Perry from the EP Ferras, 2014
 "Legends Never Die", a song by Orville Peck and Shania Twain from the EP Show Pony, 2020

See also
 "Heroes Get Remembered, Legends Never Die", a song by Four Year Strong on the 2007 album Rise or Die Trying